Angela Maraventano (born September 14, 1964) is an Italian politician, senator of Northern League elected in Emilia-Romagna during the election of 2008. She was deputy-mayor of Lampedusa from May 2007 to January 2009.

References

External links 
 Videoportrait of Angela Maraventano by CorriereTV.
 Profile at Italian Senate

1964 births
Living people
People from San Benedetto del Tronto
Members of the Senate of the Republic (Italy)